Mount Biliran is a solfataric active complex volcano located in the island province of Biliran in the Philippines. The volcano caused the formation of the island.

Geological features 
Rock Type: Hornblende andesite containing greenish and black hornblende
Tectonic Setting: Biliran Volcano is part of the curvilinear belt of Quaternary volcanoes in eastern Philippines, parallel to Phil. Trench to the east

Volcanic activity 
Number of Historical Eruptions: 1
Latest Eruption/Activity: September 26, 1939
Site: crater
Eruption Character: Debris avalanche
Affected Areas/Remarks: Ashfall at Caibiran and adjoining areas (6.35 cm thick deposits)
Monitoring activity: Short-term monitoring in 1954

Physical features 
Hotsprings:
Central Biliran – Libtong Thermal Areas (12 hot springs and one bubbling pool)
North Biliran – Panamao Thermal Area 
Anas Thermal Area
South Biliran – Kalambis Thermal Area
Adjacent Volcanic Edifice:
Panamao (107 m asl)
Gumansan (1064 m asl)
Lauan (1187 m asl)
Suiro (1301 m asl)

See also
List of active volcanoes in the Philippines
Philippine Institute of Volcanology and Seismology
List of inactive volcanoes in the Philippines
List of potentially active volcanoes in the Philippines

References 

 
Topo Sheets: 3854 I, 3855 II, 3955 III, 3854 II, 3954 III.

External links
 Philippine Institute of Volcanology and Seismology (PHIVOLCS) Biliran Page
 Biliran Island

Landforms of Biliran
Volcanoes of the Visayas
Active volcanoes of the Philippines
Complex volcanoes